Miss Tibet is an annual beauty pageant held in McLeod Ganj, India. It is produced by Lobsang Wangyal Productions.

History
The first-ever Miss Tibet Pageant was produced by Lobsang Wangyal in October 2002. The pageant was criticized as "aping western culture" and "un-Tibetan". The pageant has continued yearly since then.

In 2017 director Lobsang Wangyal announced that he would not continue organising the Pageant, and it could be sold to someone who would carry on its ideals.

In 2002, four Tibetan girls participated in the competition. Four editions of the Pageant's 15-year history — 2003, 2005, 2013, and 2014 — had only one participant. In 2006, the swimsuit competition was opened to the public.

The Miss Tibet Pageant 2012 was cancelled in response to increased tensions in Tibet and in support of the protests there.

The Dalai Lama considers the pageant unimportant, but it is still held due to popular demand.

Many winners and one contestant have participated in international pageants.

Miss Tibet 2019

There is no Miss Tibet Pageant for 2019, as there were no applicants.

Miss Tibet 2018
The Miss Tibet Pageant 2018 was held in New York City, US, with one contestant, Tenzin Yonten, who was declared the Miss Tibet 2018.

Miss Tibet 2017

Tenzin Paldon from Karnataka, India, was crowned Miss Tibet 2017 at the Tibetan Institute of Performing Arts in McLeod Ganj, India, on 4 June 2017. She received Rs one lakh (100,000) (US$2,200). Tenzin Khechoe was judged the first runner-up, receiving Rs 50,000. Tenzin Nordron was chosen as the second runner-up and was given a cheque of Rs 25,000. The winner and the First Runner-up also won a two-week trip to Vietnam, sponsored by Claire Huynh Hong Hai. The three judges for the event were Ms Tanshuman Gurung, Mr Abhishek Madhukar, and Ms Anshdeep Kaur. Chemi Kyizom also participated in Miss Tibet 2017 

At the finale of the event, director Lobsang Wangyal announced his intention to withdraw from organising the pageant, and sell it to someone who would carry it on with the same objectives.

List of Contestants
 See Full 2017 contestant information

Miss Tibet 2016

Tenzing Sangnyi was selected as Miss Tibet 2016. She received a cash prize of Rs one lakh (100,000), donated by sponsor Jangchup Nyendak. First runner-up Tenzin Dawa from New York won Rs 50,000, and second runner-up Tenzing Dickey from Bylakuppe received Rs 25,000.

Tenzing Dickey also won the Miss Photogenic vote this year.

List of Contestants
– Full 2016 contestant information

Miss Tibet 2015
Pema Choedon from Dehra Dun was crowned Miss Tibet 2015 at the Tibetan Institute of Performing Arts in McLeod Ganj, India, on 7 June 2015. She received one lakh (100,000.00) Indian rupees (equivalent to US$2,200).

Lobsang Kyizom, 22 years old, was judged the first runner-up. She received Rs 50,000.00. Tsering Dolma, 24, was chosen as the second runner-up. She was given a cheque of Rs 25,000.00.

The Pageant was kept low-key and held only one day to express solidarity with victims of the earthquake in Nepal.

List of Contestants

– Full contestant information

Miss Tibet 2014
Tenzin Yangzom from Sikkim was selected unopposed as the titleholder of Miss Tibet 2014. She is multi-lingual and likes dancing, basketball, singing, painting and photography. Out of 8 applications received 5 were confirmed, but 4 withdrew at the last minute citing personal reasons.

Miss Tibet 2013 
A coronation ceremony of the Miss Tibet 2013 was held in Bangalore as Tenzing Lhamo from Madison, US, was the only one to come to participate in the pageant. She donated the prize money of Rs 100,000 for Tibetan activism. The pageant was originally planned to be held in Bylakuppe, Karnataka, the largest Tibetan settlement in India.

Miss Tibet 2012
The Miss Tibet Pageant 2012 was cancelled in response to increased tensions in Tibet and in support of the protests there. The Pageant was to be held in Dharamshala, India, from 8 to 10 June 2012.

Miss Tibet 2011
Miss Tibet Pageant 2011 was the 10th edition of the annual event. The pageant was held in Dharamshala from 3 to 5 June. Tenzin Yangkyi was selected by the judges as Miss Tibet 2011. She represented Tibet in the Miss Asia Pacific World 2011 beauty pageant.

Controversy/Accusations of fraud
On 5 June 2012 Australian Broadcasting Corporation's Foreign Correspondent program aired a report which had followed contestants preparing for and undertaking the Miss Tibet 2011 contest. The report outlined the contestant's understanding of how they would be judged – a judging panel of non-Tibetans would be marking the contestants presentations. At the end of the program controversy erupted when the winner was announced.

One contestant remarked that she thought Tenzin Khecheo would have won. Another stated "I think Lobsang Wangyul cheated – he's a fraud." The pageant organiser, Lobsang Wangyal, was confronted by the contestants who wanted to know how the judging had been processed. At first Lobsang Wangyal claimed the marking sheets had been stolen. "I don't have the judges' sheet.  It was stolen ... on the night. ... It's not in the file. The file is empty. ... When I went onstage somebody stole it. I too was surprised." The contestants then pressed Lobsang Wangyal further, at which point he admitted the non-Tibetan judge's markings only affected 25% of the overall evaluation – that he himself controlled the remaining 75% of the marking, and as such, had effectively decided by himself which contestant had won. The confrontation then ended with the contestants walking out and stating to Lobsang Wangyal "You are a fraud." To which Lobsang Wangyal responded "Yeah ... yeah I am."

Lobsang Wangyal then made a follow up statement to the camera saying "Miss Tibet should be someone who should be calm and, you know ... listen and ... be respectful and see ... if this is how Miss Tibetan will be ... oh my god ... no way."

The report then finished with a comment from Ngodop Dolma: "When I look back into Miss Tibet what I've come to realise is that Lobsang's Miss Tibet does not empower Tibetan women but it does the opposite. It actually disempowers Tibetan women. So, I believe the only way it could have any values is if it were run by a woman."

Director Lobsang Wangyal's response

Lobsang Wangyal responded a few months after the report was made through a posting on  misstibet.com in which he says that Mr Gould's recruited contestant Ngodup Dolma made the accusation only after she was unsuccessful in the contest. In his statement Lobsang accepted that the folder containing the mark sheets of the finale night had been stolen after the coronation, and suggested that Mr Gould or an accomplice was involved.

List of Contestants

– Full contestant information

Miss Tibet 2010
Tenzin Norzom from Varanasi, holder of a Shastri degree (equivalent to Bachelor of Arts in Buddhist Philosophy), was crowned Miss Tibet 2010 at the Tibetan Institute of Performing Arts in McLeod Ganj, India, on 6 June 2010. She received one lakh (100,000.00) Indian rupees (equivalent to US$2,200). After the crowning, Norzom said she would use the title to promote the Tibetan cause.

Yangchen Metok, a 19-year-old girl who had escaped to India in 2008, was judged the first runner-up. She received Rs 50,000.00. Rinchen Choden, a 25-year-old hair stylist from Bangalore, was chosen as the second runner-up. She was given a cheque of Rs 25,000.00. The fourth place Tenzin Namchoe from Golok, Tibet, was given a token prize of Rs 10,000.

Considering the Kyigudo earthquake in eastern Tibet in April, the pageant was kept low-profile. No firecrackers were set off, but instead a short prayer session was held at the opening of the show. Lobsang Wangyal, the director and the producer of the event, gave Rs.10,000 in donation to the victims of the earthquake.

Kingfisher, a leading Indian brand, sponsored the pageant.

List of Contestants

Miss Tibet 2009

Miss Tibet 2009 was held from 16–18 June 2009. The finale was held on 7 June at Tipa. The four participants arrived in McLeod Ganj on 28 May. A week's training was given from 29 May, until 4 June. The first round — the swim suit round — of the Miss Tibet pageant 2009 was held on 5 June. Two more rounds — talk and talent rounds — was held on 6 June. The remaining four rounds — introduction, evening gown, traditional costume and interview rounds — were held on 7 June at Tipa.

Thousands in the audience witnessed the crowning of Tenzin Choezom as the new Miss Tibet. Dr BK Modi, the Chairman of the Spice Corp, crowned the winner. He also presented a scholarship cheque of one lakh rupees (Rs 100,000) to Choezom. Ngawang Choying was picked the first runner-up and Dolkar the second runner-up by a four-member jury. Ngawang and Dolkar received scholarship cheques of Rs 50,000 and Rs 25,000 respectively. Yeshi was presented a consolation prize of Rs 5,000.

List of Contestants

Miss Tibet 2008
Miss Tibet Pageant 2008 was held on Sunday 12 October 2008 at The Tibetan Institute of Performing Arts (TIPA), Dharamshala, India. Two young women competed for the crown — Sonam Choedon, who came from Tibet to India in June 2008, and Jamyang Chentso, born in India Sonam Choedon won the title.

Sonam Choedon is a student. She is currently learning languages: English and Hindi. She is fluent in Tibetan and Chinese.

List of Contestants

Miss Tibet 2007
Miss Tibet Pageant 2007 was held from 12 to 14 October 2007 in McLeod Ganj, Dharamshala, India. Five young Tibetan women took part in the pageant. Tenzin Dolma from McLeod Ganj was crowned Miss Tibet 2007. She received a scholarship cheque of Rs 100,000 (US$2,500). She represented Tibet in the Miss Earth 2007 pageant in the Philippines in November 2007.

Tsering Yangzom from Kollegal Tibetan settlement, south India, was the First runner-up. She received Rs 50,000 in scholarship. She was also the "Miss Photogenic", receiving 1170 of the 3156 votes cast online at misstibet.com.

Deeki Dolma from Gangtok, Sikkim, was declared the Second runner-up. She received Rs 25,000.

List of Contestants

Summary of Winners

Participation in International Pageants
Many winners and one contestant have participated in international pageants. 

The first Miss Tibet, in 2002, Dolma Tsering, has competed in two international pageants. She also won the Miss Goodwill subsidiary title from the pageant in Malaysia and the Best National Costume from another pageant in Mexico.

– Full international pageant information

Interference from Chinese government

The Chinese government has tried to interfere, pressuring international directors to name Miss Tibet as "Miss Tibet-China". Two Miss Tibets had to withdraw from international pageants — Zimbabwe and Malaysia — after they were asked to wear sashes with this title, and refused.

Miss Tibet 2007 Tenzin Dolma was asked to wear such a sash in the Philippines at the last minute, but she refused, and was allowed to go ahead with the "Miss Tibet" sash.

Miss Tibet 2006 Tsering Chungtak withdrew from the Miss Tourism Pageant in Malaysia after Chinese government representatives pressured the organiser to enter her as "Miss Tibet-China" in November 2007.

Miss Tibet 2004 Tashi Yangchen had to withdraw from a pageant in Zimbabwe after the Chinese embassy in Harare, the capital of Zimbabwe, in a similar case of Chinese interference, asked her to wear a "Miss Tibet-China" sash in February 2005.

In October 2011, Tenzin Yangkyi, Miss Tibet 2011, was sent to the Miss Asia Pacific World 2011 beauty pageant, held in Daegu, Seoul, and Busan in South Korea. During the pageant, Yangkyi received pressure from the Chinese government to wear a sash saying "Tibet-China", but she refused. Instead, she decided to change the sash name to "Swiss Tibet", as she is a Swiss citizen.

Footnotes

External links and references
 Little Lhasa: Reflections on Exiled Tibet, by Tsering Namgyal. Chapter 5, "Miss Tibet", pp. 65–77.
Lobsang Wangyal Productions
Miss Earth Pageant
Miss Himalaya Pageant
Miss Tibet Pageant

Beauty pageants in India
Dharamshala
Recurring events established in 2002
Tibetan culture
2002 establishments in India